Walter Craig may refer to:

 Walter Craig (American football), American football coach
 Walter Early Craig (1909–1986), United States federal judge
 Walter Craig (cricketer) (1846–1923), English cricketer
 Walter Craig (actor), American actor
 Walter Craig (mathematician) (1953–2019), Canadian mathematician
 Walter F. Craig (1854–1933), New York City violinist and conductor
Walter H. Craig (1880–1937), Pennsylvania State Representative